In molecular biology, glycoside hydrolase family 35 is a family of glycoside hydrolases.

Glycoside hydrolases  are a widespread group of enzymes that hydrolyse the glycosidic bond between two or more carbohydrates, or between a carbohydrate and a non-carbohydrate moiety. A classification system for glycoside hydrolases, based on sequence similarity, has led to the definition of >100 different families. This classification is available on the CAZy web site, and also discussed at CAZypedia, an online encyclopedia of carbohydrate active enzymes.

Glycoside hydrolase family 35 CAZY GH_35 comprises enzymes with only one known activity; beta-galactosidase. Mammalian beta-galactosidase is a lysosomal enzyme (gene GLB1) which cleaves the terminal galactose from gangliosides, glycoproteins, and glycosaminoglycans and whose deficiency is the cause of the genetic disease Gm(1) gangliosidosis (Morquio disease type B).

References 

EC 3.2.1
GH family
Protein families